The Casino Lakes are a chain of four alpine glacial lakes in Custer County, Idaho, United States, located in the White Cloud Mountains in the Sawtooth National Recreation Area.  The lakes are located on the upper portion of the Big Casino Creek watershed, a tributary of the Salmon River.  The lakes have not been individually named, and Sawtooth National Forest trail 646 leads to the lakes.

References

See also

 List of lakes of the White Cloud Mountains
 Sawtooth National Forest
 Sawtooth National Recreation Area
 White Cloud Mountains

Lakes of Idaho
Lakes of Custer County, Idaho
Glacial lakes of the United States
Glacial lakes of the Sawtooth National Forest